Mary Ann is a 1919 Hungarian silent drama film directed by Alexander Korda and starring Ica von Lenkeffy, Tivadar Uray and Dezső Gyárfás . It was based on the play Merely Mary Ann by Israel Zangwill.

Cast
 Ica von Lenkeffy   
 Tivadar Uray   
 Dezső Gyárfás 
 Nusi Somogyi   
 Hermin Haraszti   
 Gyula Szőreghy

References

Bibliography
 Kulik, Karol. Alexander Korda: The Man Who Could Work Miracles. Virgin Books, 1990.

External links

1918 films
Hungarian silent films
Hungarian drama films
1910s Hungarian-language films
Films directed by Alexander Korda
Films based on British novels
Hungarian black-and-white films
1918 drama films
Silent drama films